Izvoare is a commune in Sîngerei District, Moldova. It is composed of two villages, Izvoare and Valea Norocului.

References

Communes of Sîngerei District